Birhan Getahun (born 5 September 1991 in Afar) is an Ethiopian runner. He competed in the 3000 m steeplechase event at the 2012 Summer Olympics. He was the steeplechase champion at the 2011 All-Africa Games.

References

External links

1991 births
Living people
Sportspeople from Afar Region
Ethiopian male long-distance runners
Ethiopian male steeplechase runners
Olympic athletes of Ethiopia
Athletes (track and field) at the 2012 Summer Olympics
African Games gold medalists for Ethiopia
African Games medalists in athletics (track and field)
Athletes (track and field) at the 2011 All-Africa Games
20th-century Ethiopian people
21st-century Ethiopian people